Řepiště is a municipality and village in Frýdek-Místek District in the Moravian-Silesian Region of the Czech Republic. It has about 1,900 inhabitants.

Geography
Řepiště lies in the historical region of Cieszyn Silesia. The municipality is located in the Ostrava Basin on the right bank of the Ostravice River, which forms the western municipal border.

History
Řepiště was probably founded around 1270 under the name Barutov. The first written mention of the village is in a document from 1450, in which Bolesław II, Duke of Cieszyn bequeath his wife Anna the territory of the Duchy of Teschen.

Řepiště became a seat of a Catholic parish in the second half of 15th century. After 1540s Protestant Reformation prevailed in the Duchy of Teschen and a local Catholic church was taken over by Lutherans. It was taken from them (as one from around fifty buildings in the region) by a special commission and given back to the Roman Catholic Church on 26 March 1654.

Sights
The most important landmark in Řepiště is the wooden Church of Saint Michael the Archangel, part of a set of Silesian wooden churches. It was founded in 1484 or 1485.

References

External links

Villages in Frýdek-Místek District
Cieszyn Silesia